Atrytonopsis is a genus of butterflies in the skipper family, Hesperiidae. They are native to Mexico and the southwestern United States.

Species include:
Atrytonopsis austinorum Warren, 2011
Atrytonopsis cestus (Edwards, 1884) – cestus skipper
Atrytonopsis deva (Edwards, 1876) – Deva skipper
Atrytonopsis edwardsi Barnes & McDunnough, 1916
Atrytonopsis frappenda (Dyar, 1920)
Atrytonopsis hianna (Scudder, 1868) – dusted skipper
Atrytonopsis loammi (Whitney, 1876)
Atrytonopsis lunus (Edwards, 1884) – moon-marked skipper
Atrytonopsis ovinia (Hewitson, [1866])
Atrytonopsis pittacus (Edwards, 1882) – white-barred skipper
Atrytonopsis python (Edwards, 1882) – python skipper
Atrytonopsis quinteri Burns, 2015
Atrytonopsis vierecki (Skinner, 1902) – Viereck's skipper
Atrytonopsis zweifeli Freeman, 1969

References

External links
Atrytonopsis. Integrated Taxonomic Information System (ITIS)
Atrytonopsis. Natural History Museum Lepidoptera Database.
Atrytonopsis. funet.

Hesperiini
Hesperiidae genera
Taxa named by Frederick DuCane Godman